Northumberland is a borough in Northumberland County, Pennsylvania, United States. The population was 3,804 at the 2010 census.

History

A brewer named Reuben Haines, a native of Philadelphia, Pennsylvania, founded the town of Northumberland in 1772, attempting to set it up as an English village. The land that became Northumberland was purchased from the Iroquois in the first Treaty of Fort Stanwix in 1768, and the village was laid out in 1772. During the American Revolution, Northumberland was evacuated during the Big Runaway in 1778, and only finally resettled in 1784.

Northumberland was the American home of eighteenth-century British theologian, Dissenting clergyman, natural philosopher, educator, and political theorist Joseph Priestley (1733–1804) from 1794 until his death in 1804. The Joseph Priestley House still stands on Priestley Avenue and is a National Historic Landmark on the National Register of Historic Places (NRHP) and a museum administered by the Pennsylvania Historical and Museum Commission. There is one other property in the borough on the NRHP: the Priestley-Forsyth Memorial Library, built by a great grandson of Joseph Priestley. Much of the borough is part of the Northumberland Historic District, which is also on the NRHP.

Geography

Northumberland is located at  (40.893935, -76.795975), approximately 60 miles northeast of Harrisburg. It sits at the confluence of the north and west branches of the Susquehanna River.

According to the U.S. Census Bureau, the borough has a total area of 1.6 square miles (4.1 km2), all land.

Demographics

As of the census of 2000, there were 3,714 people, 1,657 households, and 1,045 families residing in the borough. The racial makeup of the borough was 98.38% White, 0.73% African American, 0.13% Native American, 0.19% Asian, 0.40% from other races, and 0.16% from two or more races. Hispanic or Latino of any race were 0.62% of the population.

There were 1,657 households, out of which 25.9% had children under the age of 18 living with them, 50.3% were married couples living together, 10.3% had a female householder with no husband present, and 36.9% were non-families. 32.0% of all households were made up of individuals, and 13.3% had someone living alone who was 65 years of age or older. The average household size was 2.22 and the average family size was 2.79.

In the borough the population was spread out, with 21.7% under the age of 18, 6.7% from 18 to 24, 29.2% from 25 to 44, 24.2% from 45 to 64, and 18.2% who were 65 years of age or older. The median age was 40 years. For every 100 females, there were 90.1 males. For every 100 females age 18 and over, there were 85.8 males.

The median income for a household in the borough was $31,891, and the median income for a family was $38,807. Males had a median income of $31,162 versus $22,203 for females. The per capita income for the borough was $18,229. About 4.5% of families and 7.7% of the population were below the poverty line, including 7.7% of those under age 18 and 6.8% of those age 65 or over.

Government 
A seven-seat Council governs the Borough of Northumberland, with a mayor taking on a largely ceremonial role. Council members serve for four-year terms, as does the mayor. The current mayor, Len Zboray was appointed in July 2011 to complete the term of Past Mayor Gretchen Brosius upon her resignation.

Notable people
English chemist and codiscoverer of oxygen Joseph Priestley lived in Northumberland for the last decade of his life, until his death in 1804. The Joseph Priestley House remains standing, as a museum.

World War II Major General Uzal Girard Ent, who had led the August 1943 raid on the Romanian oil refineries in Ploiești, chose Colonel Paul Tibbets to lead the 509th Composite Group, asking him to organize and lead a combat force to deliver a new type of explosive device that is so powerful that its full potential was unknown. Tibbets did so, and was the commander and pilot of the Enola Gay, the plane that delivered the first atomic bomb (Little Boy) on Hiroshima, Japan, on August 6, 1945. The Enola Gay's navigator on the mission was Captain Theodore "Dutch" Van Kirk, also a native of Northumberland, who was among the men hand-selected by Tibbets to accomplish the mission.
 
Daniel McFarlan Moore was born in Northumberland and was an electrical engineer and inventor, who developed a novel light source, the "Moore lamp," and a business that produced them in the early 1900s. The Moore lamp was the first commercially viable light-source based on gas discharges instead of incandescence; it was the predecessor to contemporary neon lighting and fluorescent lighting. In his later career, Moore developed a miniature neon lamp, which was extensively used in electronic displays, and vacuum tubes, which were used in early television systems.

David Fulmer, the author of a series of seven novels about Storyville, New Orleans and five other works of fiction and the writer-producer of the documentary film "Blind Willie's Blues," was born in Northumberland in 1950 and resided there until he was eighteen. Fulmer's mother and father were lifelong residents of the borough.

Helen Taggart Clark (pen name, H. T. C.; 1849–1918), born in Northumberland, was a journalist and poet.

Elizabeth Nesbitt (1897 – 1977), born in Northumberland, was a children's librarian and library science educator.

References

External links

Pennsylvania populated places on the Susquehanna River
Populated places established in 1772
Boroughs in Northumberland County, Pennsylvania
1828 establishments in Pennsylvania